Cheluvina Chilipili is a 2009 Indian Kannada-language romantic drama film directed by S. Narayan. A remake of the Telugu film Kotha Bangaru Lokam, the film stars his son Pankaj and newcomer Roopika. The film released to mixed reviews. The film bears a similar to title to S. Narayan's film Cheluvina Chittara.

Cast  
Pankaj as Balu 
Roopika as Swapna
Rajendra Karanth as Swapna's father 
Anant Nag
Sumalatha
Dwarakish
Sundar

Production
S. Narayan cast in son (in his second film) and newcomer Roopika in the lead roles.

Music
Mickey J Meyer, who composed the music for the original, reused his tunes. The audio launch of the film was attended by Ambareesh and Sumalatha.

Release and reception
The film was released on 28 August 2009. The film released at the same time as the film Iniya. 

A critic from Bangalore Mirror criticised Pankaj's acting and opined that "S Narayan has to extract acting from his son the same way he does with other actors" On the contrary, a critic from The Times of India gave the film a rating of three out of five stars and said that "Pankaj excels in romantic, dramatic and action scenes. Roopika is simply superb. Anant Nag and Sumalata do a commendable job. Mickey Meyer's music is good. Jagadish Wali has done a good job with the camera". A critic from The New Indian Express gave the same review and said that "Cheluvina Chilipili is a good family oriented film with message for college students". R. G. Vijayasarathy of Rediff.com gave the film a rating of two out of five stars and opined that "All in all, Cheluvina Chilipili is an enjoyable film".

References

External links
 

Indian romantic drama films
2000s Kannada-language films
2009 romantic drama films
Films directed by S. Narayan
Kannada remakes of Telugu films